The Town of Holly is a statutory town in Prowers County in southeastern Colorado, United States, near the Kansas border. The town population was 837 at the 2020 United States Census.

History

Early history
Holly was settled as a ranching community, and the town was incorporated in 1903. The town was named for Hiram S. Holly, a local cattleman. Hiram S. Holly moved to the town in 1871, and brought 1,300 cattle with him. Holly's ranch, the SS Ranch or Double S Ranch, was the first settlement in the area.  The Holly SS Ranch Barn, a stone barn built in 1879, survives and is listed on the National Register of Historic Places.  The original stone ranch house also survives, nearby, but is not listed.

Holly Sugar
Holly Sugar was created in the town in 1905 just in time for the sugarbeet harvest that year.  The production was so successful the company quickly looked to expand to other communities.  By 1911, Holly Sugar had expanded outside the State of Colorado.  The company has long since left the Holly community.  In 1988, Holly Sugar merged with Imperial Sugar.

2007 Holly tornado

2011 Jensen Farms listeriosis outbreak

Geography
Holly is located at  (38.054520, -102.125398).

At the 2020 United States Census, the town had a total area of  including  of water.

Climate
The Köppen Climate system classifies the weather as semi-arid, abbreviated as BSk.

Demographics

As of the census of 2000, there were 1,048 people, 369 households, and 250 families residing in the town. The racial makeup of the town was 75.10% White, 0.38% Native American, 0.10% Asian, 23.66% from other races, and 0.76% from two or more races. Hispanic or Latino of any race were 35.97% of the population.

There were 369 households, out of which 39.0% had children under the age of 18 living with them, 54.5% were married couples living together, 8.7% had a female householder with no husband present, and 32.0% were non-families. 27.9% of all households were made up of individuals, and 16.3% had someone living alone who was 65 years of age or older.  The average household size was 2.71 and the average family size was 3.36.

In the town, the population was spread out, with 32.0% under the age of 18, 8.4% from 18 to 24, 24.0% from 25 to 44, 19.8% from 45 to 64, and 15.8% who were 65 years of age or older.  The median age was 34 years. For every 100 females, there were 103.1 males.  For every 100 females age 18 and over, there were 91.2 males.

The median income for a household in the town was $24,917, and the median income for a family was $31,979. Males had a median income of $23,000 versus $21,250 for females. The per capita income for the town was $14,246.  About 21.7% of families and 27.9% of the population were below the poverty line, including 37.5% of those under age 18 and 20.7% of those age 65 or over.

Notable residents
Holly is the hometown of former Colorado Governor Roy Romer, who moved there as an infant from his birthplace of Garden City, Kansas. Romer is also a former chairman of the Democratic National Committee and a longtime supporter of former U.S. President Bill Clinton.

Donald Wagner (September 24, 1918 to February 8, 2004) lived in Holly area from the time he was 3 years old. Serving on the school board, he was instrumental in getting the Holly Jr Sr High School built in the 1960s.

Well-known evangelist A.A. Allen pastored a church in Holly for several years beginning in 1936.

Gallery

See also

Colorado
Bibliography of Colorado
Index of Colorado-related articles
Outline of Colorado
List of counties in Colorado
List of municipalities in Colorado
List of places in Colorado
National Old Trails Road
Roy Romer
Santa Fe National Historic Trail

References

External links

Town of Holly website
CDOT map of the Town of Holly

Towns in Prowers County, Colorado
Towns in Colorado
Colorado populated places on the Arkansas River